The 2015 Richmond Kickers season is the club's twenty-third season of existence. It is also the Kickers' eighth-consecutive year in the third-tier of American soccer, playing in the United Soccer League for their fourth season.

First team squad
As of 31 May 2015

First team roster

Goalscorers
Includes all competitive matches. The list is sorted alphabetically by surname when total goals are equal.

Correct as of match played on 30 May 2015

Non-competitive

Preseason

Midseason exhibitions

Competitive

USL

Table

Results

USL Pro Playoffs

U.S. Open Cup

References 

Richmond Kickers seasons
Richmond Kickers
Richmond Kickers
Richmond Kickers